Banjari is a small town at the south-western tip of Bihar state, India.  It is located on the Sone River, the largest of the Ganges' southern tributaries, in Rohtas district.  It is framed by the Kaimur mountain range, to the south-east of Sasaram. 
 
Banjari has a diverse climate, subtropical in general, with hot summers and cool winters.

Economy 
Bihar is a vast stretch of fertile plain. Since Sher Shah Suri introduced the zabt-e-zameen system in the entire region, agricultural activities became the primary support of the economy.

The nearest market is Akbarpur market, at a distance of 3 km.

Dalmia DSP Cement Limited (DDSPL,Kalyanpur) 
One of the largest cement manufacturing facilities of the state, Kalyanpur Cements Ltd., located in Banjari, is a leading cement manufacturer of  eastern India. It runs the only integrated cement manufacturing facility in Bihar and markets its cement in Bihar, Jharkhand and Uttar Pradesh.

Kalyanpur, which was established in 1937, marketed its cement under the popular KC Super, KC Special and Castcrete brands.

In the year 2018, Dalmia Cement Bharat Limited acquired Kalyanpur Cement Limited (KCL) and is currently operating the plant under the brand name of Dalmia DSP Limited.

Surya Narayan Dev Mandir 

Banjari is situated on the bank of the river Sone.  There is a temple known as the "Surya Narayan Dev Mandir".  In front of the temple there are ghats.  A fine view of the river can be seen from the ghats.  The amalgamation of the naturally-made river and the man-made temple is really awesome. However the temple was made with the help of the local public and Mr. S.R.S Krishnan, president of the Kalyanpur cement company. Since Mr. Krishnan, who was from south India, had a view of a statue in his mind for the temple, and so he ordered the south Indian style statue.  The statue of the temple was brought from Varanasi.  And this became the symbol of Hindu religion.

This temple is steadily gaining in popularity.  Now the people come here to make their wishes.  The great Chhath Pooja (Worshipping of the Surya Dev) is an ancient and major festival in Bihar, celebrated here during the month of November.  The Chaiti Chhath Pooja (April) is also  celebrated. During this pooja, people of native land gather here to offer their worship to the god Surya Dev.

Transportation 
The Dehri-On-Sone railway station is the nearest railway station which is located 36 km from the Dalmia DSP Ltd plant.

Gaya International Airport is the nearest airport located 139 km from Kalyanpur. Lal Bahadur Shastri International Airport is the major airport nearby for international and domestic flights, located 178 km from Kalyanpur.

Communications 
Official language is Hindi, dialects include Bhojpuri, Magadhi and Maithili which are often spoken.

References

Cities and towns in Rohtas district